Putrajaya Sentral is a bus hub and a train station on the Express Rail Link (ERL) in Presint 7, Putrajaya, Malaysia. It is served by the ERL KLIA Transit Line under the name Putrajaya & Cyberjaya. On 16 March 2023, the MRT Putrajaya Line began operations under the name Putrajaya Sentral. This station will be located at the southernmost point of Rapid KL rail network.

Putrajaya Sentral also comprises other multimodal transport services apart from the ERL & MRT stations, which includes the unfinished Putrajaya Monorail station (abandoned as of now), a taxi centre, and a bus hub (currently utilised by RapidKL and Nadi Putra buses) that has city buses serving Putrajaya, express buses serving the city and scheduled intercity buses. The station complex also contains a couple of restaurants and shops selling clothes.

In the future, it will be integrated with the proposed Putrajaya Monorail.

Station layout
A common concourse exists for both the KLIA Transit platforms and the Putrajaya Monorail platforms. The new MRT station is located on the eastern side of the complex and is connected to the main building via a pedestrian walkway.

Gallery

Bus services
All trunk and feeder buses are located in Terminal D near the MRT station. Express bus and shuttle to Heriot-Watt University Malaysia branch remain located in Terminal B.

MRT Feeder Bus routes
With the opening of the MRT Putrajaya Line, feeder buses also began operating linking the station with areas in Putrajaya.

Nadi Putra routes

Bus Expressway Transit (BET) routes
The BET routes (BET13 & BET 15) were ceased operations from 2020.

Trunk routes

References 

Express Rail Link
Rapid transit stations in Putrajaya